Gobern is a surname. Notable people with the surname include:

Oscar Gobern (born 1991), English footballer, brother of Lewis
Lewis Gobern (born 1985), English footballer